Jean Thompson Kasem (born May 21, 1954) is  a former American actress. She is the widow of radio personality and actor  Casey Kasem.

Early life
Jean Thompson was one of five children born to Irene Celia Thompson and Herbert Owens Thompson Sr. (deceased).  She is of Norwegian heritage on her mother's side. She was born in Portsmouth, New Hampshire, where she lived before her civil-servant father moved the family to Guam in 1963. She attended the University of Guam at age 16, but after marrying a U.S. Navy lieutenant when she was 17, she left to work as a waitress and saleswoman on U.S. military bases throughout the Pacific Ocean to which her husband was posted. The marriage lasted six years. She moved to California and unsuccessfully attempted to find work in broadcast journalism. Frustrated, she joined an acting workshop and soon found roles on such TV series as Matt Houston, Fantasy Island and Alice.

Career
Kasem played the recurring role of Loretta Tortelli, the wife of Nick Tortelli (Dan Hedaya) on Cheers and as a cast-member of the short-lived spinoff The Tortellis. She has also worked as voice actor for such animated television series as Darkwing Duck, 2 Stupid Dogs, Shaggy & Scooby-Doo Get a Clue!, Johnny Bravo, and Mother Goose and Grimm.

She made guest appearances in several movies and television shows, including Growing Pains, Cybill, Hunter, Family Feud, Hollywood Squares, My Two Dads, Hope & Gloria and others. She holds twelve patents with the United States Patent and Trademark Office, all pertaining to crib and canopy design, developed for her crib business,  Little Miss Liberty Round Crib Company.

Personal life
She was married to radio personality Casey Kasem from 1980 until his death in 2014, and they had one child together, Liberty Jean Kasem.

In 1989, Casey Kasem purchased a house built in 1954, previously owned by developer Abraham M. Lurie, as a birthday present for her.

Stepchildren and conservatorship

Casey Kasem had three children from a previous marriage: Kerri, Julie, and Mike Kasem. In October 2013, Kerri Kasem said that her father was suffering from Parkinson's disease; a few months later, she said Casey Kasem had been diagnosed with Lewy body dementia, which is often difficult to differentiate from Parkinson's. Owing to his condition, he was no longer able to speak.

On October 1, 2013, Kerri Kasem, her siblings, their uncle, Casey's brother, as well as numerous friends and colleagues protested outside Casey and Jean Kasem's home, saying Jean Kasem had been preventing contact with Casey Kasem for three months. Six days later, Julie Kasem and her husband, Dr. Jamil Aboulhosn, filed a conservatorship petition to place Casey Kasem under their care. The court denied their petition.

On May 12, 2014, Kerri Kasem was granted conservatorship over Jean Kasem's objection. The court ordered an investigation into Casey Kasem's whereabouts, after Jean Kasem's attorney argued the court had no jurisdiction as he was "no longer in the United States," but did not give any information to the court about Kasem's whereabouts. But after Casey was located in Washington state, Kerri Kasem was given custody.

Casey Kasem died on June 15, 2014, aged 82. His widow was given her husband's body for funeral arrangements, and Casey Kasem was buried in the Vestre Gravlund cemetery in Oslo, Norway.

Filmography

References

External links

1954 births
Living people
Guamanian actresses
Actresses from New Hampshire
American television actresses
American film actresses
American voice actresses
People from Portsmouth, New Hampshire
20th-century American actresses
University of Guam alumni
21st-century American women